The 2016 Asia Cup (also called the Micromax Asia Cup T20) was a Twenty20 International (T20I) cricket tournament that was held in Bangladesh from 24 February to 6 March 2016. It was the 13th edition of the Asia Cup, the fifth to be held in Bangladesh, and the first to be played using the T20I format. Bangladesh hosted the tournament for the third consecutive time after 2012 and 2014. Micromax was the main sponsor of the tournament after 2012.

Along with Bangladesh (the host) and Sri Lanka (the defending champions from the 2014 event), the tournament included India, Pakistan, and ICC associate member the United Arab Emirates, who qualified from a qualifier played from 19 to 22 February 2016.

India beat Bangladesh by 8 wickets in the final to win their sixth Asia Cup title and were unbeaten throughout the tournament.

Teams
 
 
 
 
  (Qualifier)

Squads

Bhuvneshwar Kumar was added to India's squad as a replacement for Mohammed Shami after Shami failed to fully recover from a hamstring injury. Parthiv Patel was added to India's squad as a back-up for MS Dhoni, who suffered a muscle spasm. Mohammad Sami and Sharjeel Khan were added to Pakistan's squad after injuries to Babar Azam and Rumman Raees and following their performances in 2016 Pakistan Super League. Bangladesh's Mustafizur Rahman was injured during their match against Sri Lanka and was replaced for the rest of the tournament by Tamim Iqbal.

Lasith Malinga was named as Sri Lanka's captain for the tournament, but he only played in their first match. Angelo Mathews captained the side in their second and third matches while Dinesh Chandimal stood as captain in their final match.

Background
After the Asian Cricket Council was downsized by the International Cricket Council (ICC) in April 2015, it was announced that upcoming Asia Cup events will be played on rotation basis in One Day International (ODI) and Twenty20 International (T20I) format based on respective next world events under the ICC. This means that the 2016 and 2020 events will be played using the T20I format, ahead of the 2016 and 2020 World Twenty20s, and the 2018 and 2022 events will be played in ODI format, ahead of the 2019 and 2023 World Cups respectively.

Venue
All eleven matches of the tournament were played at the Sher-e-Bangla National Cricket Stadium in Mirpur, Dhaka.

Group stage

Standings
 Advance to Final

Matches

Final

Statistics

Most runs

Most wickets

References

External links
 Series home at ESPN Cricinfo

 
Asia Cup
Asia Cup
Asia Cup
Asia Cup